Lycée Français Alphonse de Lamartine de Sofia (LFAL, in Bulgarian: 9-та френска езикова гимназия „Алфонс дьо Ламартин", ФЕГ) is a selective French language school in Sofia, established in 1961 under the name 9th French Language School Georgi Kirkov. Since the early 1990s, it has been named after the French nobleman, poet, diplomat and politician Alphonse de Lamartine, who visited and resided in the Bulgarian lands in 1832.

The Lycée is the only Bulgarian school to offer bilingual French-speaking course to all its students and has been the described as "the most important French-speaking secondary school in Bulgaria" as well as "the heart of the academic Francophonie in Bulgaria" by the Agency for French Education Abroad. It is regarded as one of the most prestigious schools in Sofia and its students have consistently ranked among the top performers in the national matriculation exams.

As of the 2020–2021 academic year, the school had 987 students and 83 staff members, with a student-teacher ratio of 1:14.

History

Early years
In 1881, missionaries founded an American girls' school in Lovech, which gained popularity and prestige in the coming decades. In 1927, it became an American College and began to issue high school diplomas. The college was forcibly closed in 1948 as a conductor of "capitalist ideology", but in 1950, the Foreign Language High School, which gained popularity through the film Vchera, was created in its place. Four of the school's classes studied French, one studied English and one studied German. In 1956, the English class moved to Sofia and started the First English Language School. In 1958, the French section moved to Varna and founded the Lycée Joliot-Curie. In 1960, the German High School in Sofia emerged from the German section, and in the following year the French section was separated from it.

Establishment
When it was founded in 1961, the Lycée was housed in the Nadezhda district along with the German High School. For the academic year of 1963, it was relocated to its present building at 35  Patriarch Evtimiy Boulevard in downtown Sofia, which at that time housed the 9th Polytechnic High School. The last year group of the Polytechnic School graduated in 1965, and the school became purely linguistic. Classes with Spanish language were also opened in 1977, but in 1991, they were moved to the newly established Spanish Language School Miguel de Cervantes.

In 1976, the Lycée was awarded the Order of Saints Cyril and Methodius, and in 1977, it was accepted as a member of the UNESCO Associated Schools Network. During his historic visit to Bulgaria in 1989, French President François Mitterrand visited the school, where he was greeted by students. Mitterrand got carried away conversing with the students and stayed longer than planned, violating the protocol.

Teachers' strike
In 2007, many teachers from across the country went on a strike. The Lycée's teachers gained notoriety across the country for marking all of their 900 students with excellent grades in protest of the low teachers' pay and the government's refusal to grant more money for scholarships.

A number of unannounced inspections followed as a result of the teachers' actions. The school's then principle, Penka Malinska, was accused of undermining its prestige and "financial misuse" of the scholarships which the students had received as a result of the higher marks. Malinska was forcibly retired despite not having reached retirement age at the time. Her retirement was accompanied by an acute reaction from both students and teachers. Over a hundred students marched in her support, starting at the Lycée's entrance and ending in front of the building of the Ministry of Education and Science.

Education
The Lycée has established traditions and high authority in French language training. Intensive language learning is done through a program which includes 20 hours of French weekly in 8th, also called preparatory, grade and from 6 to 8 hours in later years. Some subjects, such as history, geography, biology, physics, chemistry and philosophy, are taught in French. The school's graduates can enroll in French universities without a language exam. In 2015, the school was awarded the LabelFrancÉducation, a seal of quality for bilingual education in French and another language.

During the five years of study, French literature and culture are extensively and chronologically studied in all their genres. Eleventh and twelfth grade students can submit and defend a dossier in a school subject of their choice, for which they can receive a bilingual education diploma, known as Attestation bilingue.

The Lycée's students can enroll in Microsoft's MCP Program for which they can receive a certificate which validates their technical expertise.

Language certificates
The school is the largest DELF examination center in Bulgaria, given the large number of students and candidates. The certification was introduced in 2007 by a Convention signed between the Ministry of Education and Science of Bulgaria and the French Institut of Sofia and is renewed every three years. All of the school's French language teachers are CIEP accredited examiners.

Approximately 5500 students have been enrolled in the DELF A2, B1 and B2 examinations at the Lycée Lamartine Examination Center from 2007 to 2020.

Teachers
The Lycée employs more than 70 teachers. Many of them are authors of text- and handbooks, give lectures and teach at Sofia University, New Bulgarian University and other universities. More than half of the high school teachers are former graduates and a part of the French language teachers are French.

Traditions
The school's motto is "Ça ira puisque nous sommes ensemble!".

Arts
The Lycée has established traditions in theater. Each year, its theatrical troupe produces and presents a play based on a different piece by a classical French author, for which it has won several awards. The school has a choir.

Photography lessons are offered as a complementary subject, and there are plenty of exhibitions on the walls of the school's hallways.

Sports
The school's volleyball and basketball teams participate in the prestigious Claris Cup, in which the elite high schools of Sofia compete against each other, and the football team participates in the Bulgarian School Football League. The school also offers other sporting activities such as badminton, tennis, table tennis, skiing, swimming and chess.

International relations
The school offers educational and cultural exchanges with French-language schools from Europe, including Lycée Jacques Decour and Lycée Gerson in Paris, Collège Claparède in Geneva, Lycée Jean Pierre Vernant in Sèvres and more. The school's projects are supported by the French Institute of Sofia.

Curriculum

In popular culture
Slavi Trifonov's 1998 album Vavilon features a song entitled "The French High School".

Notable former pupils
Carla Rahal, actress
Dimiter Tzantchev, diplomat, Permanent Representative of Bulgaria to the European Union, Permanent Representative to the United Nations
Iliana Iotova, former MEP, Vice President of Bulgaria
Ivailo Kalfin, former MEP, former Minister of Foreign Affairs, former Minister of Labour and Social Policy
Kiril Domuschiev, entrepreneur, president of Ludogorets
Marin Raykov, diplomat, former Ambassador of Bulgaria to France, former caretaker Prime Minister of Bulgaria, former Deputy Minister of Foreign Affairs
Nadezhda Neynsky, former Minister of Foreign Affairs, former MEP, former Ambassador of Bulgaria to Turkey
Radan Kanev, politician, chairman of DSB
Ruzha Lazarova, writer
Silvia Lulcheva, actress
Slavcho Binev, politician, MP in the 43rd National Assembly, former MEP, athlete and businessman
Stefan Tafrov, diplomat, Permanent Representative to the United Nations, former Ambassador of Bulgaria to France, Commandeur de la Légion d'Honneur

References

External links

Language schools